Bihar Agricultural University is an autonomous institute under Bihar state government established on 5 August, 2010 under Indian Council of Agricultural Research (ICAR) and is situated at Sabour, Bhagalpur district of Bihar. At present, it is located in Bihar Agricultural College, Sabour Campus, the oldest agricultural college of the state.

Agriculture Knowledge Dissemination System
Bihar Agriculture University is engaged in Research and Extension activities in the field of agriculture. In order to extend the research done in the University to farmers of Bihar, it signed an agreement with World Development Foundation, New Delhi to implement a project of "Agriculture Knowledge Dissemination System". The project basically involved educating the farmers using ICT and video conferencing system for improved agriculture and livestock production.

Colleges
The university has ten colleges:
 Bihar Agricultural College, Sabour
 Bhola Paswan Shastri Agricultural College, Purnea
 Mandan Bharti Agriculture College, Agwanpur
 Nalanda College of Horticulture, Noorsarai
 Dr. Kalam Agricultural College, Kishanganj
 VKS College of Agriculture, Dumraon
 Forestry college Munger
 Agriculture Business Management college Patna
 Biotechnology college Arah
 Community Science and Food Technology college Gaya

References

https://www.business-standard.com/article/pti-stories/three-colleges-to-be-set-up-under-bihar-agriculture-university-118030800212_1.html

https://m.jagran.com/bihar/patna-city-mungers-first-forestry-college-in-the-province-will-14276270.html

External links

 

Agricultural universities and colleges in Bihar
Education in Bhagalpur district
Educational institutions established in 2010
2010 establishments in Bihar